Dieter or dieter may refer to: 

 A person committed to dieting

People
Dieter is a German given name, a short form of Dietrich, from  theod+ric "people ruler", see Theodoric.

Given name 
Dieter Althaus (born 1958), German politician 
Dieter Bohlen (born 1954), German music producer
Dieter Borsche (1909–1982), German actor 
Dieter Brummer (1976–2021), Australian actor
Dieter Dengler (1938–2001), American Vietnam War veteran
Dieter Dierks (born 1943), German musician
Dieter Eiselen (born 1996), South African American football player
Dieter Fox (born 1966), German roboticist
Dieter Gerhardt (born 1935), Soviet spy
Dieter Hallervorden (born 1935), German comedian
Dieter Thomas Heck (1937–2018), German television presenter, singer and actor 
Dieter Helm (1941–2022), German farmer and politician
Dieter Hoeneß (born 1953), German football (soccer) player
Dieter Kühn (born 1956), East German football (soccer) player
Dieter Lüst (born 1956), German physicist
Dieter Meier (born 1945), Swiss musician
Dieter Nuhr (born 1960), German comedian 
Dieter Rams (born 1932), German industrial designer
Dieter Ruehle (born 1968), American sports organist 
Dieter Schnebel (1930–2018), German composer
Hans-Dieter Sues (born 1956), German-born American paleontologist, Senior Scientist and Curator of Vertebrate Paleontology at the National Museum of Natural History of the Smithsonian Institution in Washington, DC
Dieter Thoma (born 1969), German ski jumper
Dieter F. Uchtdorf (born 1940), LDS leader
 Dieter Wisliceny (1911–1948), German Nazi SS officer and perpetrator of the Holocaust executed for war crimes
Dieter Zetsche (born 1953), German engineer and businessman

Surname 
 Giovanni Battista Dieter (1903–1955), bishop
 Paul Dieter (born 1959), sound engineer and record producer
 Walter Dieter (1916–1988), Canadian First Nations leader

Fictional 
 Dieter, a recurring character on Saturday Night Live played by Mike Myers and host of a fictional German television show skit called Sprockets

Other
 Dieter: Der Film, a 2006 film about Dieter Bohlen
 Dieter: Der Film (soundtrack), the soundtrack of the film
 Dieter Township, Roseau County, Minnesota, United States
 the demon in Norman Mailer's book, The Castle in the Forest
 Dispatch and Investment Evaluation Tool with Endogenous Renewables, an Open energy system model

See also
 Dietrich (disambiguation)
 Theodoric

German masculine given names